Cedro is a city  in the state of Pernambuco, Brazil. The population in 2020, according with IBGE was 11,891 and the area is 148.75 km².

Geography

 State - Pernambuco
 Region - Sertão Pernambucano
 Boundaries - Ceará state   (N);  Serrita  (S and W);  Salgueiro  (E).
 Area - 144.09 km²
 Elevation - 546 m
 Hydrography - Terra Nova River
 Vegetation - Caatinga hipoxerófila
 Climate - semi arid - hot and dry
 Annual average temperature - 25.2 c
 Distance to Recife - 561 km

Economy

The main economic activities in Cedro are based in agribusiness, especially creation of cattle, goats, sheep, pigs;  and plantations of tomatoes and beans.

Economic Indicators

Economy by Sector
2006

Health Indicators

References

Municipalities in Pernambuco